"Na Na Na (Na Na Na Na Na Na Na Na Na)" is a song by American rock band My Chemical Romance. It is the second track and first single from their fourth studio album, Danger Days: The True Lives of the Fabulous Killjoys (2010).

Background

According to lead vocalist Gerard Way, the band had struggled with the departure of drummer Bob Bryar and was dissatisfied with the progress of the sessions for their fourth studio album until the recording of "Na Na Na". A breakthrough was achieved once the chord progressions for the song were in place, with Way explaining,"That's the moment where we said, 'This song changes everything. We're starting over right now. We're starting it over with [producer Rob] Cavallo, and we're doing it now'. Everything up to that point had felt like we had been in this kind of stasis, and as artists, stasis really equals death. So, it was so bad, the vibe wasn't good, and then 'Na Na' happened. And then, all of a sudden, there was this real, big intensity underneath us, and it was the momentum we needed to dig deep and record another album". The song was not originally intended as a single, but due to the positive response to the album's teaser video, "Art is the Weapon", it was released and a full music video was shot.

Promotion
"Na Na Na" was premiered on air September 22, 2010 via WRFF in Philadelphia, Zane Lowe on BBC Radio 1, and KROQ-FM in Los Angeles. The artwork was released on the band's website the next day. The song was released on September 28, 2010 in North America for purchase at online music stores and was released on November 8, 2010 in the United Kingdom. On the day the single was released in North America, a lyric video, which primarily literally depicts the words in the song, was released on YouTube. WWE named "Na Na Na" as the official theme song for the 2010 Tables Ladders & Chairs PPV.

Music video

Development and release
The music video premiered on MTV on October 14, 2010. The video was co-directed by Roboshobo and Gerard Way and features comic book author Grant Morrison. The music video was first previewed in the short trailer titled "Art is the Weapon" which was released on September 17, 2010. Album opener "Look Alive, Sunshine" was included in the music video. MTV posted photo previews on October 8, and a 30-second preview video on October 11. On a "Making of" video, Gerard Way expressed interest in shooting a third part to the Killjoy story.

Synopsis
The video features a strangely garbed outlaw gang called the Killjoys (Gerard Way as Party Poison, Mikey Way as Kobra Kid, Ray Toro as Jet Star and Frank Iero as Fun Ghoul), who are being pursued in the badlands around Battery City by the sinister executive Korse (Morrison) of Better Living Industries (BL/ind) and his vampire-masked henchmen (the Draculoids); in between battles with Better Living, the gang are indulging in pornographic magazines, fast driving, and hacking vending machines. The Killjoys have a young girl named Missile Kid as one of their members (portrayed by Grace Jeanette), whom BL/ind is out to capture. At the end of the video, after a standoff, the Killjoys lie defeated on the ground, and Missile Kid has been captured by Korse and the Draculoids. Korse tells the Killjoys to "Keep running." The music video for later single "Sing" is a companion piece and continues the story of the Killjoys and BL/ind; the lyrics "keep running" tie it to "Na Na Na".

In an interview with the band for KROQ-FM, Gerard Way revealed that members of the band Mindless Self Indulgence appear in the video, with guitarist Steve Righ? as DJ "Dr. Death Defying", and vocalist Jimmy Urine as the "main, tall Draculoid". Urine was originally intended to play the roller skater "Show Pony", but was changed to a Draculoid as he cannot skate. After the video's premiere, MTV released a "Pop-Culture Cheat Sheet" listing many of the movie and TV references in the video, including films such as Blade Runner, Easy Rider, Terminator 2: Judgment Day, Ultraviolet and, perhaps most prominently, the "Mad Max" franchise. There is also a reference to their previous album 'The Black Parade' at the 1:28 marker in the video where a half buried skeleton wearing a black marching jacket at the bottom of the screen can be seen. Similarly, one of the "Transmissions" by Dr. Death on the band's website features a Killjoy (presumably Party Poison) searching through an abandoned room, passing by Mikey Way's Black Parade uniform from the music videos Welcome to the Black Parade and Famous Last Words, and picking up one of the skull-designed masks featured in Black Parade merchandise, before finding the MOUSEKAT mask seen in the video for Na Na Na. On a related note, the MOUSEKAT character is featured in one of BL/ind's transmissions as a Mickey Mouse-style cartoon propaganda character promoting the drugs used to keep humans under BL/ind's influence, in the fictional reality that accompanies Danger Days.

As of September 2021, the song has 80 million views on YouTube.

The band won Best Video at the 2011 NME Awards for this track.

Promotion and publication

Publication and dissemination of the song

On Friday, September 17, 2010, the band posted on its official account YouTube a trailer for the new album called "Art is the Weapon" which included snippets of "Na Na Na". Originally, they had not planned on filming a full video for the track or releasing it as a single but due to feedback by fans to the trailer, they changed their minds. On Wednesday, September 22, 2010, "Na Na Na" was premiered worldwide on BBC Radio 1 and KROQ. The song was released for radio play on September 28, 2010.

The track was released on a 7" vinyl record in November 2010 in Europe, then later on April 16, 2011, in America to celebrate Record Store Day. The single includes the non-album track Zero Percent.

Live performances
"Na Na Na" was used in many concerts as the opening song on the promotional tour for the album, The World Contamination Tour as well as on the Honda Civic Tour 2011. The band performed the song on the  Jimmy Kimmel Live! TV program on November 18, 2010, additionally playing an altered version of their song "Sing." They played the song at a pre-show party football in Wembley Stadium of London (England), on October 31, 2010. The game was part of the International Series of the American League NFL, with the San Francisco 49ers facing the Denver Broncos. Gerard Way said: "It was great, because it's a song about hard drugs and blow up the world, and we were doing it literally with a marching band, cheerleaders, fireworks and party football about to begin ... was amazing, it was very subversive and brilliant." The band also played the single from their third album "Welcome to the Black Parade".

Critical reception
"Na Na Na (Na Na Na Na Na Na Na Na Na)" has been met with generally positive critical enthusiasm. Spins William Goldman described "Na Na Na" as an "in-your-face punk anthem with blistering guitar leads, an epic breakdown, and Gerard Way's sneering delivery", and added, "it's classic MCR and it's all hinged on an unforgettable, hockey-arena-filling chorus of na, na, na, na, na, nas". Jason Lipshutz of Billboard called the song a "three-minute punk-rock blast" that "is a startling change of pace from My Chemical Romance's 2006 concept album The Black Parade". NMEs Dan Martin said the song is "rooted in the here and now, with the most simple pop song refrain rebooted as nothing less than a generational call to arms". Sara D. Anderson of AOL Radio noted, "By the looks of their new single and its paired video teaser, MCR are opting for an effervescent, light-hearted sound compared to their heavier-themed efforts." MTV's Chris Ryan said the song "gets right to the point, exploding out of the gate with an absolutely ferocious riff that could have been ripped right off of an old Stooges album. Singer Gerard Way sounds in fine form, going toe to toe with the guitars".

Chart performance
"Na Na Na (Na Na Na Na Na Na Na Na Na)" debuted at number twenty-one on the Billboard Rock Songs chart and number ten on the Alternative Songs chart for the charting week dated October 9, 2010. The song moved up to number nineteen on the Alternative Songs chart the next week, earning the title of Greatest Gainer.

Certifications

Track listing
 All songs written by Bob Bryar, Frank Iero, Ray Toro, Gerard Way, and Mikey Way.
Version 1 (promotional CD)

Version 2 (promotional CD)

Version 3 (digital download)

Version 4 (7″ vinyl and CD)

References

2010 singles
My Chemical Romance songs
Song recordings produced by Rob Cavallo
2010 songs
Reprise Records singles
Songs written by Frank Iero
Songs written by Ray Toro
Songs written by Gerard Way
Songs written by Mikey Way